George Hearne may refer to:

George Hearne (cricketer, born 1829) (1829–1904), English cricketer, the father of George Gibbons Hearne
George Francis Hearne (1851–1931), English cricketer
George Gibbons Hearne (1856–1932), Test cricketer who played for England and South Africa, the son of George Hearne and father of George Alfred Lawrence Hearne
George Alfred Lawrence Hearne (1888–1978), South African Test cricketer, the son of George Gibbons Hearne

See also
George Hearn (disambiguation)